Ari Borovoy (born May 29, 1979 in Mexico City)  is a founding member of the Latin music children's group La Onda Vaselina which evolved into the successful Latin pop group OV7. As a songwriter, he had a hand in creating several of the group's biggest hits, including "Aum Aum," "Shake Shake," "Te Necesito" and "No Me Voy." He has also recorded solo albums, starred on telenovelas and in films.

OV7 disbanded in 2003 and the OV7 brand remained inactive until Borovoy and five members reunited in 2010. During the interim, Borovoy launched a solo career, starting with an acting role on the Televisa telenovela Clap... El Lugar De Tus Sueños. His first solo album, Ari Borovoy, appeared in 2005, with the single "Booming" emerging as a hit. Borovoy had a hand in writing nine of the album's tracks.

Borovoy's second solo album, Pasajero, was released in 2008. The disc was issued under Borovoy's own label, BoBo Producciones, and he produced the album and wrote five songs. The first single was titled "Vivo"

Personal life

Borovoy's father is Mexican while his mother is Costa Rican. He has two siblings, Jack and Denise. He is also Debi Nova's cousin.

On December 4, 2010, he married Arlett Kalach in a civil ceremony in Mexico City; on January 15, 2011, the two renewed their vows in a Jewish ceremony.

In October 2012, Borovoy announced that the couple was expecting their first child. The baby is due in April.

Solo discography 
 Ari Borovoy - 2005
 Pasajero - 2008

TV roles 
 Clap, el lugar de tus sueños - 2003
 RBD La Familia - 2007
 Verano de Amor - 2009

Films 
 Cuatro Labios - 2006
 Deseo - 2013

References

External links

1979 births
Living people
Mexican male film actors
Mexican people of Costa Rican-Jewish descent
Mexican pop singers
Mexican songwriters
Male songwriters
Singers from Mexico City
Latin pop singers
Jewish singers
Jewish male actors
Mexican Jews
Male actors from Mexico City
21st-century Mexican singers
21st-century Mexican male singers